The Metropolis GZM (formally in Polish Górnośląsko-Zagłębiowska Metropolia) is a metropolitan unit composed of 41 contiguous municipalities in the Silesian Voivodeship of Poland. The seat of the metropolitan council is Katowice, the largest city of the region and the voivodeship capital. With a population exceeding 2 million, the Metropolis GZM is one of the largest urban areas in the European Union and forms a part of the wider Katowice urban area within the transnational Upper Silesian metropolitan area, the latter with a population of 5–5.3 million people.

Metropolis GZM was created in June 2017 act of Parliament, with its boundaries defined by a regulation of Poland's Council of Ministers which expanded the earlier existing Upper Silesia Metropolitan Union. That original union was formed ten year earlier in Świętochłowice by 14 core cities. The purpose of the metropolitan union is to maintain a strong urban and industrially developed area with internationally competitive profile and unified management of all infrastructure. For these tasks, the union receives 5% of the income tax of its residents and participating municipalities.

Location
The Metropolis GZM spans urban and suburban communities in the historical regions of Upper Silesia (the South-Eastern part of Silesia) as well as Lesser Poland's Zagłębie Dąbrowskie in the modern Silesian Voivodeship in southern Poland, within the northern portion of the Upper Silesian Coal Basin between the Vistula and Oder rivers. It is located roughly 72 km West of Kraków and 260 km South-West of Warsaw. Other major population centers in relative proximity to the metropolis include: Ostrava (70 km), Vienna (290 km), Prague (320 km) and Bratislava (270 km).

Transportation

Road transportation 
The Metropolis GZM has extensive road network, including national highways A4 and A1, as well as S1 and S86 expressways. Warsaw is connected to the agglomeration through National Road no. 1, commonly known as Gierkówka (after Edward Gierek). The agglomeration is also connected to the Beskid Mountains in the south through two extensions of Gierkówka—National Road no. 1 and National Road no. 81. Drogowa Trasa Średnicowa, an inter-urban, limited-access expressway, connects Gliwice and Katowice city centers. The GZM observes some of the highest traffic in Poland, with S86 between Katowice and Sosnowiec hosting 112,212 vehicles per day and A4 highway in Katowice seeing 100,983 vehicles per day.

Rail transportation 
The agglomeration boasts the highest density of railway lines in Poland. Katowice Train Station is the 8th busiest passenger station in the country, handling 11.9 million passengers in 2017 (up from 10.6 million in 2014), which corresponds to 32,800 passengers per day. Gliwice is the second-busiest station in the metropolis, with 10,300 passengers per day.

Regional and metropolitan trains are operated by Koleje Śląskie. Most national and international trains are operated by Polish State Railways. Gliwice and Katowice are connected to Warsaw by a fast Express Intercity Premium train (commonly called Pendolino, after the train model that operates this line). Other major cities to which the metropolis is directly connected to by trains include Berlin, Prague, Vienna, Budapest and Bratislava.

A large tram interurban network called the Silesian Interurbans still exists today connecting the urban areas of the Upper Silesia. It is one of the largest interurban networks in Europe.

Air transportation 
Katowice Airport serves as the primary airport for the Metropolitan Association, and is located approx. 30 km North of downtown Katowice. Katowice Airport is the fourth-busiest airport in Poland in terms of passenger traffic, handling 4.8 million passengers in 2018. It is also second-busiest cargo airport in the country, serving 18,543 tonnes in 2018. It is a base for Wizz Air, Ryanair Sun, Blue Panorama Airlines, Enter Air, Smartwings, and Smartwings Poland. LOT Polish Airlines base some of their aircraft in Katowice during the summer season.

The airport has daily feeder flights to Warsaw-Chopin (by LOT Polish Airlines, 4 flights), Frankfurt Airport (3 flights) and Munich Airport (1 flight, by Lufthansa). Another major cities with connections to Katowice Airport include London, Dubai, Amsterdam, Milan, Dublin, Rome, Barcelona, Lisbon, Stockholm, Athens, Kyiv and Tel Aviv. In total, there is 61 regular and 44 charter destinations.

The Metropolis GZM is also within close (60 km) proximity of Kraków Airport, which is the second-busiest airport in Poland (6.8 million passengers in 2018).

Participating municipalities
Original union included 14 city counties that form the core of the metropolitan region: (Bytom, Chorzów, Dąbrowa Górnicza, Gliwice, Jaworzno, Katowice, Mysłowice, Piekary Śląskie, Ruda Śląska, Siemianowice Śląskie, Sosnowiec, Świętochłowice, Tychy, and Zabrze.

The union could not accept more members for legal reasons because under Polish law at that time only city counties could form such union. This changed in 2017 when the Polish government created a new law designed specifically for this region's needs.

Currently, 41 municipalities form the metropolitan union. Jaworzno, which was the founding member of the original union, decided to leave the new body, citing an unwillingness to merge its public transportation subsidiary company with the metropolitan one.

Name 

The official name of the association is "Górnośląsko-Zagłębiowska Metropolia" (Upper Silesian-Dąbrowa Basin Metropolis"). This name was used on the official petition to create a metropolitan association, and later was used by the Polish Ministry of Interior in the final legal act published on June 30, 2017.

Previous name proposals included:

 Metropolia Katowice (Katowice Metropolis), first reported by regional newspaper Dziennik Zachodni but dismissed by mayors of other cities 
 Metropolia Górnośląska (Upper Silesian Metropolis), protested by mayors of Sosnowiec and Dąbrowa Górnicza as excluding the Dąbrowa Basin aspect of the region
 Metropolia Silesia (Silesia Metropolis), used by the association itself and commonly used in media but protested by scholars who asked that the association does not assume the name of the entire region. Additionally, similarly to Upper Silesian Metropolis, communities from Dąbrowa Basin part of the region complained it ignores their history.

Budget 
Pursuant to the law, the Metropolis receives 5% of the PIT from persons residing in its territory. In addition, a contribution is established for the municipalities included in its composition.

In 2017, the budget of the Metropolis amounted to PLN 12,306,418. In 2018, the budget amounted to PLN 361,053,107.

Population 
The Metropolis is inhabited by over 2.2 million people. The population of the cities and gminas comprising the metropolis, as well as the entire voivodeship, has been steadily decreasing since 1989, mainly due to natural decrease and negative migration balance.

Economy 
In 2020 Katowice's gross metropolitan product was almost  €40 billion. This puts Katowice in 60th place among cities in European Union.

See also
Tricity, a metropolitan area in Poland consisting of three cities in Pomerania

References

External links
 GZM Site
 Statute of the Metropolitan Association of Upper Silesia
 Euroregiony
 www.samorzad.pap.com.pl
 www.katowice.nasze miasto.pl
 Pomysł powstania największego miasta w Polsce - Silesii

Silesia
Katowice